Sinocupido is a genus of butterflies in the family Lycaenidae. The genus is monotypic,  containing the single species Sinocupido lokiangensis. The genus and the species were described from China (Xinjiang) in 1963. Very little is known about them.

References

Polyommatini
Lycaenidae genera
Monotypic butterfly genera